Coleophora pseudosquamosella is a moth of the family Coleophoridae. It is found in France and Italy.

The larvae possibly feed on Aster alpinus. They feed on the flowers and fruits of their host plant.

References

pseudosquamosella
Moths of Europe
Moths described in 2003